Comfort is an unincorporated community located in the town of Weston, Dunn County, Wisconsin, United States.

The community was named for Comfort Starr.

Notes

Unincorporated communities in Dunn County, Wisconsin
Unincorporated communities in Wisconsin